
Gmina Ostrzeszów is an urban-rural gmina (administrative district) in Ostrzeszów County, Greater Poland Voivodeship, in west-central Poland.

Villages
Apart from the town of Ostrzeszów, Gmina Ostrzeszów contains the villages and settlements of Bledzianów, Jesiona, Kochłowy, Korpysy, Kotowskie, Kozły, Królewskie, Kuźniki, Marydół, Myje, Niedźwiedź, Olszyna, Ostrzeszów-Pustkowie, Potaśnia, Rejmanka, Rogaszyce, Rojów, Siedlików, Szklarka Myślniewska, Szklarka Przygodzicka, Turze and Zajączki.

Neighbouring gminas
Gmina Ostrzeszów is bordered by the gminas of Doruchów, Grabów nad Prosną, Kępno, Kobyla Góra, Mikstat, Przygodzice and Sośnie.

References
Polish official population figures 2006

Ostrzeszow
Ostrzeszów County